Experts Exchange (EE) is a website for people in information technology (IT) related jobs to ask each other for tech help, receive instant help via chat, hire freelancers, and browse tech jobs. Controversy has surrounded their policy of providing answers only via paid subscription.

History 
Experts Exchange went live in October 1996. The first question asked was for a "Case sensitive Win31 HTML Editor".

Experts Exchange went bankrupt in 2001 after venture capitalists moved the company to San Mateo, CA, and was brought back largely through the efforts of unpaid volunteers.

Later, Austin Miller and Randy Redberg took ownership of Experts Exchange, and the company was made profitable again. Experts Exchange claims to have more than 3 million solutions. Its users are mainly young to middle-aged males in the IT field.

Paywall 
In the past, the site employed HTTP cookie and HTTP referer inspection to display content selectively. The page shown employed JavaScript to display answers to humans after some content showing how to become a member. Subsequently, when an internal link was clicked by the user, they were blocked from viewing the answer information until either becoming a paid member or spoofing their browser's User Agent string to that of a search engine crawler such as GoogleBot.

In response to these obfuscation techniques, which prevented anonymous users from seeing answer content, a few members of the community wrote articles about how to bypass the obfuscation by spoofing one's web browser referrer using an addon like Smart Referrer and setting the referer as being from Google.

Stack Overflow founder Jeff Atwood cited Experts-Exchange's poor reputation and paywall as a motivation for creating Stack Overflow.

See also

 Bulletin board system
 Chat room
 Internet forum
 Virtual community

References

External links 
 Experts Exchange

American social networking websites
Software developer communities
Internet properties established in 1996
Question-and-answer websites